The Ancient and Honorable Artillery Company of Massachusetts is the oldest chartered military organization in North America and the third oldest chartered military organization in the world. Its charter was granted in March 1638 by the Great and General Court of Massachusetts Bay and signed by Governor John Winthrop as a volunteer militia company to train officers enrolled in the local militia companies across Massachusetts. With the professionalization of the US Military preceding World War I including the creation of the National Guard of the United States and the federalization of officer training, the company's mission changed to a supportive role in preserving the historic and patriotic traditions of Boston, Massachusetts, and the Nation. Today the Company serves as Honor Guard to the Governor of Massachusetts who is also its Commander in Chief. The headquarters is located on the 4th floor of Faneuil Hall and consists of an armory, library, offices, quartermaster department, commissary, and military museum with free admission.

History
 

As the settlements which followed the landing at Plymouth increased and spread, there was no organized military force for protection — only local volunteer companies, which lacked the capacity for joint action or any centralized authority. The English Government had no standing army, with the only permanent force (other than Royal bodyguards) being the locally organised Militia, in which all able males between 16 and 60 were liable to serve as required for home defence. This part-time force was extended to the New World colonies following the settlement of Virginia in 1607 and its offshoot Bermuda in 1609–1612, and to other colonies as they were established. Many of the settlers of Boston had been members in England of the Honourable Artillery Company (HAC) of London, and the military training they had received in that company led them to form a similar organization in the new country. In 1637 the company was formed as a citizen militia for instruction in military discipline and tactics. Robert Keayne and many of the original members of the Ancient and Honorable Artillery Company had been members of the original HAC of London.

Governor Winthrop granted a charter on March 13, 1638, and on the first Monday in June following, an election of officers was held on Boston Common. The original name of the company was "The Military Company of Massachusetts". It began to be referred to as "The Ancient and Honorable Artillery Company" in the year 1737.

Among the charter members was Nicholas Upsall, who later forsook his membership to join the Quakers. Since that time, the company has continued to hold their annual elections on the Boston Common on the first Monday in June by casting their votes on a drum head. Company membership has long been considered a distinction among the New England gentry in a similar manner to which regimental membership conferred distinction on the sons of the English gentry. The Honourable Artillery Company of London and the Ancient and Honorable Artillery Company of Massachusetts acknowledge and celebrate their common historical roots.

Since 1746, the headquarters of the company has been located in Faneuil Hall. In this armory, the company maintains a military museum with free admission and library containing relics from every war the United States has fought since its settlement. The armory is open to the public daily.

Prior to 1913, the Company served as the de facto officer school for the Massachusetts Militia. (Although not all officers in the Massachusetts Militia were selected from members of the company.) In 1913, the Massachusetts Militia established the Training School for officer training. This school was later renamed the Massachusetts Military Academy and is today designated the 101st Regiment — Regional Training Institute (RTI).

The company reenacts the election of officers every 1st Monday in June (June Day Parade).  A parade consisting of the AHAC, Massachusetts National Guard (MANG), members of the USS Constitution, Washington Light Infantry (South Carolina), and other historic military groups from across New England participate in the parade from Faneuil Hall to Boston Common. On occasion, members of the Honorable Artillery Company of London participate. A representative of the Swiss Guard may also be in attendance. Upon the arrival of the Governor of the State of Massachusetts, the MANG will fire a cannon volley. During the reenactment ceremony, the Governor will accept resignations of the Captain Commanding, and 1st and 2nd Lieutenants. New commissions will be issued by the Governor.

Membership
Membership in the company has traditionally been selected from the upper middle and upper classes of Boston society. In recent decades membership has been expanded to include those from outside of Massachusetts. It is common for senior officers in the Massachusetts National Guard to be members of the company. Although prior military service is not a requirement for membership, about one third of the current (2014) members of the Company have served in the Armed Forces of the United States, in most cases as commissioned officers.

Prior to the late 20th Century, the membership of the company was almost exclusively Anglo-Americans. In recent decades, however, the company has recruited a more diverse membership.

Most individuals who join the company are elected as Regular Members. After serving in the company for a prescribed period of time, Regular Members become Life Members.

Individuals who are descendants of members of the Company who joined prior to 1738 may join as members by right of descent. Members by Right of Descent have discounted membership fees but may not vote or hold office in the company. Members by Right of Descent residing in New England are enrolled as full (regular) members and pay full dues. In rare cases, honorary membership is extended to highly distinguished individuals. Right of Descent membership qualifies the Ancient and Honorable Artillery Company to be listed as a member organization of the Hereditary Society Community of the United States of America, where it maintains its position as the oldest American lineage society in existence.

Ancient and Honorable Artillery Company members have served in King Philip's War, King William's War, Queen Anne's War, King George's War, the French and Indian War, the Revolutionary War, the War of 1812, the Mexican War, the Civil War, World War I, World War II, the Korean War, the Vietnam War, the Gulf War, the Iraq War and Operation Enduring Freedom in Afghanistan.

The company has had ten members who were awarded the Medal of Honor (three of whom are still living), and has also had four members who served as President of the United States: Presidents James Monroe, Chester A. Arthur, Calvin Coolidge and John F. Kennedy. Honorary membership was also extended to Prince Albert, King Edward VII and King George V. A number of Governors of Massachusetts have also been members of the company.

In 2012, the organization voted to induct its first woman members. Lieutenant Colonel Catherine M. Corkery and Colonel Christine Hoffmann, both officers in the Massachusetts National Guard, were inducted into the organization on September 17, 2012.

Motto
 
The company's official motto is "Facta Non Verba" – a Latin phrase meaning "Deeds Not Words".

Noteworthy members

Presidents of the United States

James Monroe
James Garfield
Calvin Coolidge
John F. Kennedy

Medal of Honor recipients
Colonel Harvey C. Barnum, USMC
Captain George L. Street III, USN
Captain Thomas Hudner, USN
Captain Thomas G. Kelley, USN
Lieutenant Colonel Francis S. Hesseltine, USV
Brevet Major George H. Maynard, USV
Captain Jacklyn Harold Lucas, USAR
1st Lieutenant Gardner C. Hawkins, USA
Staff Sergeant Ryan Pitts, USA
Sergeant Charles A. MacGillivary, USA
Corporal Lowell M. Maxham, USV

Governors of Massachusetts
Captain Samuel Turell Armstrong – Lieutenant Governor and Mayor of Boston
Major General Nathaniel Banks – U.S. Representative
George S. Boutwell
Robert Bradford
Major General John Brooks – Revolutionary War veteran, general in the United States Army and Massachusetts Militia
Major General Benjamin Butler – U.S. Representative
Calvin Coolidge - President of the United States
James Michael Curley – Legendary Mayor of Boston and U.S. Representative
Joseph Dudley
William Dummer – Philanthropist and founder of Dummer Academy
Edward Everett – U.S. Secretary of State and U.S. Senator
Christian Herter – U.S. Secretary of State
John Leverett – Major General in command of the Massachusetts Militia and captain of the company.
Major Levi Lincoln – U.S. Representative
John D. Long (honorary member) – Secretary of the Navy
Leverett Saltonstall – U.S. Senator
Caleb Strong
Maurice J. Tobin – Mayor of Boston and U.S. Secretary of Labor
John A. Volpe – U.S. Secretary of Transportation

Public officials
Captain Edward Johnson - Founding member of the Ancient and Honorable Artillery Company, "Father of Woburn, Massachusetts"
Captain John Hull - Treasurer and mintmaster of the Massachusetts Bay Colony.
Major General Benjamin Lincoln – 1st Continental States Secretary of War; Lieutenant Governor of Massachusetts
Captain Josiah Quincy, Jr. – Mayor of Boston 
Major General Henry A. S. Dearborn – U.S. Representative
Captain John Gerrish − Merchant and Ship-Owner and Assistant Chief Justice of the New Hampshire Superior Court
Colonel Samuel C. Lawrence – Mayor of Medford, Massachusetts and Masonic Grand Master of Massachusetts
Brigadier General Augustus Pearl Martin – Civil War colonel and Mayor of Boston
Major General Ebenezer Mattoon – U.S. Representative and officer in the American Revolution
Major General George B. McClellan – Civil War general and governor of New Jersey
Henry F. Naphen – U.S. Representative
Samuel L. Powers – U.S. Representative  
Colonel Richard Saltonstall – Superior Court Judge
Major Samuel Sewall, 2nd – Chief Justice of the Massachusetts Superior Court of Judicature
Captain William Tailer – Lieutenant Governor of Massachusetts
George Washington Warren – Mayor of Charlestown, Massachusetts
Thomas L. Winthrop – Lieutenant Governor of Massachusetts
Major General Wait Winthrop – Chief Justice of the Massachusetts Superior Court

Others
William Aspinwall – Colonist
Major General Humphrey Atherton
Lieutenant Colonel Thomas Dawes 
Major General Daniel Denison
Major General William Heath – Continental Army general during the American Revolution
Major General John Hull
Brigadier General William Hull – General in the War of 1812
Captain Edward Hutchinson – officer in King Philip's War
Captain Isaac Johnson – Killed at the Great Swamp Fight
Captain Robert Keayne – First commander of the Company
Major General John Leverett
Lieutenant John Leverett the Younger – President of Harvard College
Captain John Nelson
Major Thomas Savage – 5 time commander of the Company
General Gordon Sullivan - Chief of Staff of the United States Army
Colonel Samuel Thaxter – An early commander of Ancient and Honorable Artillery Company and grandfather of Major General Benjamin Lincoln
Brevet Brigadier General William S. Tilton
Brevet Brigadier General Stephen Minot Weld, Jr.
Captain Thomas Weld
Captain Edward Winslow
Colonel Edward Winslow - Early American silversmith
Brigadier General John Winslow – Officer in the Continental Army and the Massachusetts Militia

See also
 Massachusetts Naval Militia
 Massachusetts State Defense Force
 Massachusetts Wing Civil Air Patrol
 National Lancers
 First Corps of Cadets (Massachusetts)

References

External links
Official site
The National Society of Women Descendants of the Ancient and Honorable Artillery Company
The Hereditary Society Community of the United States of America

 
Military in Massachusetts
1638 establishments in Massachusetts
Patriotic societies
Financial District, Boston
Military units and formations established in 1638
State based fraternal and lineage societies
Massachusetts Z
Museums in Boston
Military and war museums in Massachusetts
Historical reenactment groups